The Nazi Party adopted and developed several racist Scientific and Philosophical  racial classifications as part of its ideology (Nazism) in order to justify the genocide of groups of people which it deemed racially inferior. The Nazis considered the putative "Aryan race" a superior "master race", and they considered black people, mixed-race people, Slavs, Roma, Jews and other ethnic groups racially inferior "sub-humans", whose members were only suitable for slave labor and extermination. These beliefs stemmed from a mixture of 19th-century anthropology, scientific racism and anti-semitism.

Racial hierarchy
The Nazis claimed to observe a strict and scientific hierarchy of the human race. Adolf Hitler's views on race and people are found throughout his autobiographical manifesto book Mein Kampf but more specifically, they are found in chapter 11, the title of which is "Nation and Race". The standard-issue propaganda text which was issued to members of the Hitler Youth contained a chapter on "The German Races" that heavily cited the works of Hans F. K. Günther. The text seems to address the European races in descending orders in the Nazi racial hierarchy: the Nordic race (including the Phalic sub-race), the Mediterranean race, the Dinaric race, the Alpine race and the East Baltic race. In 1937 Hitler spoke in the Reichstag and declared, "I speak prophetically. Just as the discovery that the earth moved around the sun led to a complete transformation of the way people looked at the world, so too the blood and racial teachings of National Socialism will change our understanding of mankind’s past and its future."

Aryan: Germanic and Nordic

Hitler in his speeches and writings referred to the supposed existence of an "Aryan race" that he believed founded a superior type of humanity. According to Nazi ideology, the purest stock of Aryans were the Nordic people of Germany, England, the Netherlands and Scandinavia. The Nazis defined Nordics as being identified by their tall stature (average ), their long faces, their prominent chins, their narrow and straight or aquiline noses with a high base, their lean builds, their doliocephalic skulls, their straight and light hair, their light eyes, and their fair skin. The Nazis regarded the Germans as well as the English, Danish, Norwegian, and Swedish as the most racially pure in Europe.

The Nazis claimed that the Germanic peoples specifically represented a southern branch of the Aryan-Nordic population. The Nazis considered that the Nordic race was the most prominent race of the German people, but that there were other sub-races that were commonly found amongst the German people such as the Alpine race population who were identified by, among other features, their lower stature, their stocky builds, their flatter noses, and their higher incidences of darker hair and eyes). Hitler and the Nazi racial theorist Hans F. K. Günther framed this as an issue which would be corrected through the selective breeding of "Nordic" traits.

The Reichsführer-SS Heinrich Himmler in the 1920s became under the influence of Richard Walther Darré who was a leading proponent of the blood and soil concept. Darré held a strong belief that the Nordic race was racially superior to other races and that the German peasants would play a fundamental role in securing Germany's future and German expansion in Eastern Europe. Darré believed that the German peasant played a key role in the racial strength of the German people.

Himmler made all SS candidates to undergo a racial screening and forbid any German who had Slavic, Negroid or Jewish racial features from the joining the Schutzstaffel (SS). Applicants had to provide proof that they had only Aryan ancestors back to 1800 (1750 for officers).

Although Himmler endorsed occultism with his racial theories, Hitler did not and on 6 September 1938 at Nuremberg he declared:

Himmler in February 1940 spoke during a secret meeting to Gauleiters and said, "We are firmly convinced, I believe it, just as I believe in a God, I believe that our blood, the Nordic blood, is actually the best blood on this earth... In a thousand centuries this Nordic blood will still be the best. There is no other. We are superior to everything and everyone. Once we are liberated from inhibitions and restraints, there is no one who can surpass us in quality and strength."

Hitler in private in 1942 said, "I shall have no peace of mind until I have planted a seed of Nordic blood wherever the population stand in need of regeneration. If at the time of the migrations, while the great racial currents were exercising their influence, our people received so varied a share of attributes, these latter blossomed to their full value only because of the presence of the Nordic racial nucleus."

Nazi propaganda aimed at the members of the Hitler Youth emphasized the "Nordic" nature of Germans, with the text issued to all Hitler Youth members stating: "the principal ingredient of our people is the Nordic race (55%). That is not to say that half our people are pure Nordics. All of the aforementioned races appear in mixtures in all parts of our fatherland. The circumstance, however, that the great part of our people is of Nordic descent justifies us taking a Nordic standpoint when evaluating our character and spirit, bodily structure, and physical beauty." Nazi propaganda stated that the Nordic must dominate Germany, although it didn't matter if they were Germans who did not have the physical appearance of the Nordic race as long as they shared the traits of being a "German" which were considered to be "courage, loyalty and honor".

The matter of satisfactorily defining who precisely was an "Aryan" remained problematic throughout the existence of the Third Reich. In 1933, a definition of "Aryan" according to the Nazi official Albert Gorter for the Civil Service Law stated:

That definition of "Aryan" was deemed unacceptable by the Nazis because it included members of some non-Europeans ethnic groups; therefore, the Expert Advisor for Population and Racial Policy redefined an "Aryan" as someone who was "tribally" related to "German blood". It was generally agreed amongst Nazi racial theorists that the term "Aryan" was not a racial term and strictly only a linguistic term. Nevertheless, the term “Aryan” was still used in Nazi propaganda in a racial sense.

In June 1935, Nazi politician and Reich Minister of the Interior Wilhelm Frick argued that "non-Aryan" should have been replaced with "Jewish" and "of foreign origin". His recommendation was rejected. Frock then commented, "'Aryan' and 'non-Aryan' are sometimes not entirely tenable... From a racial political point, it is Judaism that interests us more than anything else."

After the Nuremberg Laws  (Law for the Protection of German Blood and German Honour and The Reich Citizenship Law) were passed in September 1935, Nazi Party lawyer and State Secretary in the Reich Interior Ministry Wilhelm Stuckart defined "related blood" (artverwandtes Blut) as:

Dr Ernst Brandis, a legal bureaucrat, who made an official comment about the Law for the Protection of German Blood and German Honour and the Law for the Protection of the Hereditary Health of the German people on 18 October 1935, defined "German blood" as:

Frick on 3 January 1936 commented about the Nuremberg Laws and defined "related blood" as:

Stuckart and Hans Globke in 1936 published the Civil Rights and the Natural Inequality of Man and wrote about the Nuremberg Laws and Reich citizenship:

The Nuremberg Laws criminalised sexual relations and marriages between people of "German or related blood" and Jews, blacks and Gypsies as Rassenschande (race defilement).

In 1938, a brochure for the Nuremberg Party Rally included all European peoples as being of "related blood" to the Germans:

However, soon after the invasion of Poland in 1939, the Nazis decided to relegate the Slavs to a non-European status:

In 1942, Himmler redefined the term "related" which until that year had referred to non-German European nations as follows: "that the racial structure of all European nations is so closely related to that of the German nation that if interbreeding occurs there is no danger that the German nation's blood will be racially contaminated". The term "related" was defined as "German blood and blood of related Germanic races" (to which members of "non-Germanic" nations who were capable of being Germanised and secondly, "related blood but not from related races", by which Himmler meant all the non-Germanic European nations (Slavs, Latins, Celts and Balts).

Jews, Roma, black people, Slavs (including Poles, Serbs and Russians) were not considered Aryans by Nazi Germany. Instead, they were considered subhuman and inferior races.

Eastern Asian people

The Nazi government began to enact racial laws after Hitler came to power in 1933, and during that year, the Japanese government protested against several racial incidents which involved Japanese or Japanese-Germans. Later, the disputes were resolved when the Nazi high command treated its Japanese allies leniently. This was especially the case after the collapse of Sino-German cooperation and the formation of the official alliance between Germany and Japan.

Chinese people and Japanese people were subjected to discrimination under Germany's racial laws, however, which—with the exception of the 1935 Nuremberg Laws, which specifically mentioned Jews – were generally applied to all "non-Aryans" but the Eastern Asian peoples (excluding Koreans and Negritos) were considered "Honorary Aryans”.

After China declared war on Germany and joined the Allies, Chinese nationals were persecuted in Germany. The Influential Nazi anti-Semite Johann von Leers favored the exclusion of Japanese people from the laws because he believed in the existence of the alleged Japanese-Aryan racial link and because he sought to improve Germany's diplomatic relations with Japan. The Foreign Ministry supported von Leers and on several occasions between 1934 and 1937, it sought to change the laws, but other government agencies, including the Racial Policy Office, opposed the change.

Hitler invited Chinese soldiers to study in German military academies and serve in the Nazi German Wehrmacht as part of their combat training. Since 1926, Germany had supported the Republic of China militarily and industrially. Germany had also sent advisers such as Alexander von Falkenhausen and Hans von Seeckt to assist the Chinese, most notably in the Chinese Civil War and China's anti-communist campaigns. Max Bauer was sent to China and served as one of Chiang Kai-shek's advisers. Around this time, Hsiang-hsi Kung (H. H. Kung), the Republic of China Minister of Finance, visited Nazi Germany and was warmly welcomed by Adolf Hitler on 13 June 1937. During this meeting, Adolf Hitler, Hermann Göring and Hjalmar Schacht bestowed upon Hsiang-hsi Kung an honorary doctorate degree, and attempted to open China's market to German exports. And in order to attract more Han Chinese students to study in Germany, Adolf Hitler, Hermann Göring and Hjalmar Schacht earmarked 100,000 reichsmarks for Han Chinese students who were studying in the universities and military academies of Nazi Germany after they persuaded a German industrialist to set aside the money for that purpose. Additionally, Hsiang-hsi Kung, who favored commercial credits, politely refused a generous international loan which was offered by Adolf Hitler. As a result of this exchange a very small number of Chinese nationals served in the German armed forces. The most famous of these Han Chinese Nazi soldiers was Chiang Wei-kuo, the son of Republic of China President Chiang Kai-shek, who studied military strategy and tactics at a Nazi German Kriegsschule in Munich, and subsequently acquired the rank of lieutenant and served as a soldier in the Wehrmacht on active combat duty in Europe until his return to the Republic of China during the later years of World War II.

Hitler in Mein Kampf wrote that he had supported the Empire of Japan as early as 1904 when he stated that, “When the Russo-Japanese War came I was older and better able to judge for myself. For national reasons I then took the side of the Japanese in our discussions. I looked upon the defeat of the Russians as a blow to Austrian Slavism“. He made a number of other statements in the book expressing his respect and admiration for the Japanese people.

Although they belonged to a different evolutionary race than the Germans did, the Japanese were considered to have sufficiently superior qualities as were people with German-Nordic blood to warrant an alliance by Nazi ideologists such as Himmler, who possessed a great interest in, and was also influenced by, the anthropology, philosophies and pantheistic religions of East Asia, mentioned how his friend Hiroshi Ōshima, the Japanese Ambassador to Germany, believed that the noble castes in Japan, the Daimyō and the Samurai, were descended from gods of celestial origin, which was similar to Himmler's own belief that "the Nordic race did not evolve, but came directly down from heaven to settle on the Atlantic continent."

Karl Haushofer, a German general, geographer, and geopolitician, whose ideas may have influenced the development of Hitler's expansionist strategies, saw Japan as the brother nation of Germany. In 1908, he was sent to Tokyo by the German Army "to study the Japanese Army and advise it as an artillery instructor. The assignment changed the course of his life and it also marked the beginning of his love affair with the orient. During the next four years, he traveled extensively in East Asia, adding Korean, Japanese, and Mandarin to his repertoire of languages, he also knew how to speak Russian, French, and English. Karl Haushofer had been a devout student of Schopenhauer, and during his stay in the Far East, he was introduced to Oriental esoteric teachings." It was based on such teachings that he came to make similar bestowals of his own upon the Japanese people, calling them the "Aryans of the East", and even calling them the "Herrenvolk of the Orient" (i.e. the "Master race of the Orient").

An October 1933 statement by Foreign Minister Konstantin von Neurath which was published in response to the Japanese protests falsely claimed that Japanese were exempt. The wide publication of this statement caused many in Germany, Japan, and elsewhere to believe that such an exemption actually existed. Instead of granting Japanese a broad exemption from the laws, an April 1935 decree stated that any racial discrimination cases that might jeopardize German diplomatic relations because they involved non-Aryans—i.e., Japanese—would be dealt with individually. Decisions on such cases often took years to make, and those people who were affected by them were unable to obtain jobs or interracially marry, primarily because the German government preferred to avoid exempting people from the laws as much as possible. The German government often exempted more German-Japanese than it preferred to because it wanted to avoid a repeat of the 1933 controversies.  And in 1934, it prohibited the German press from discussing the race laws with regard to Japanese. During World War II, Hitler privately expressed fears concerning the replacement of "white rule" in Asia (that of European colonial powers) with "yellow" supremacy as a result of Japanese conquests.

Uralic Aryans
The Nazis in an attempt to find a satisfactory definition of 'Aryan' were faced with a dilemma with regard to the European peoples who did not speak an Indo-European language or Indo-Aryan language, namely Estonians, Finns and Hungarians.

The first legal attempt was in 1933 for the Civil Service Law, when a definition of 'Aryan' was given by Albert Gorter for the Civil Service Law that included the Uralic peoples as Aryans. However, that definition was deemed unacceptable because it included some non-European peoples. Gorter changed the definition of 'Aryan' to the definition that was given by the Expert Advisor for Population and Racial Policy (Sachverständigenbeirat für Bevölkerungs- und Rassenpolitik) which was, "An Aryan is one who is tribally related (stammverwandt) to German blood. An Aryan is the descendant of a Volk domiciled in Europe in a closed tribal settlement (Volkstumssiedlung) since recorded history”. That definition of ‘Aryan’ included Estonians, Finns and Hungarians. In 1938 a commentary was made about the Nuremberg Laws that proclaimed that "the overwhelming majority" of Finns and Hungarians were of Aryan blood.

Estonians
In 1941, Nazi Germany established the Reichskommissariat Ostland in order to administer the conquered territory of Estonia. The colonial department in Berlin under Minister Alfred Rosenberg (born in Tallinn in 1893) favorably looked upon Estonians as Finno-Ugrics and thus, it looked upon them as "Aryans", Generalkommissar Karl-Siegmund Litzmann authorized the establishment of a Landeseigene Verwaltung, or a local national administration.

During the war, Hitler remarked that Estonians contained a lot of “Germanic blood”.

Finns
The Finns had a debatable position in the Nazi racial theories, as they were considered a part of the "Eastern Mongol race" with the Sámi people in traditional racial hierarchies. Finland did not have Lebensborn centres, unlike Norway, although Finland had tens of thousands of German soldiers in the country. Archival research however has found out that 26 Finnish women were in contact with the Lebensborn program for unspecified reasons.

After Germany invaded the Soviet Union in June 1941, the Finnish army, alongside German units in Lapland, invaded the USSR following Soviet air attacks on Finnish cities. Finland fought the USSR primarily in order to recover the territories which it was forced to cede to the USSR after the Moscow Peace Treaty which ended the Winter War between the Finns and the Soviets. In November 1942, owing to Finland's substantial military contribution to the German war effort on the northern flank of the Eastern Front of World War II, Hitler decreed that "from now on Finland and the Finnish people be treated and designated as a Nordic state and a Nordic people", which he considered one of the highest compliments that the Nazi government could bestow upon another country. Hitler stated in private conversation that:

Hungarians
According to the Interior Ministry, Hungarians were "tribally alien" (fremdstämmig) but were not necessarily "blood alien", which added to even more confusion with regard to defining Hungarians on a racial basis. In 1934 a brochure from the series Family, Race, Volk in the National Socialist State simply stated that the Magyars (which it did not define) were Aryans. But, the following year an article in the Journal for Racial Science on the "Racial Diagnosis of the Hungarians", remarked that "opinions on the racial condition of the Hungarians are still very divided". As late as 1943, the question of whether a Hungarian woman was to be allowed to marry a German man was disputed; she was determined to be of 'related blood' and they were allowed to get married.

Western Aryans

Although Günther and Hitler viewed Western nations as Aryans, they held dismissive racial views about the lower classes in Britain and France.

British people

According to Günther, the purest Nordic regions were Scandinavia and northern Germany, particularly Norway and Sweden, specifying: "We may, perhaps, take the Swedish blood to be over 80 per cent Nordic, the Norwegian blood about 80 per cent." Britain and southern Germany by contrast were not considered entirely Nordic. Germany was said to be 55% Nordic, and the rest Alpine (particularly southern Germany), Dinaric, or East Baltic (particularly eastern Germany). On the British Isles, Günther stated: "we may adopt the following racial proportions for these islands: Nordic blood, 60 percent; Mediterranean, 30 percent; Alpine, 10 percent." He added that "The Nordic strain in Germany seems to be rather more distributed over the whole people than in England, where it seems to belong far more to the upper classes." Hitler echoed this sentiment, referring to the British lower classes as "racially inferior".  

Up until November 1938 when Anglo-German relations started to deteriorate, Hitler had viewed the British people on the whole as fellow Aryans and saw the British Empire as a potential German ally. However, the subsequent deterioration of relations and the outbreak of World War II led Nazi propaganda to portray the British establishment as a racially degenerate for supposedly allowing thousands of Jews to immigrate to the United Kingdom, intermarry with the upper class and dominate British foreign policy. A 1944 article described Winston Churchill as a "slave of the Jews and of alcohol".

French people
Hitler viewed the French people as close to the Germans racially, but not quite their peers. He said of their racial character: "France remains hostile to us. She contains, in addition to her Nordic blood, a blood that will always be foreign to us.” Günther echoed this sentiment, saying that the French were predominantly Alpine and Mediterranean rather than Nordic, but that a heavy Nordic strain was still present. He characterized the French as possessing the following racial proportions: Nordic, 25%; Alpine or Dinaric, 50%; Mediterranean, 25%. These types were said to be most prevalent in north, central, and southern France respectively.

Hitler planned to remove a large portion of the French population to make way for German settlement. The Zone interdite of eastern France was set aside and planned to be made part of the German Reich after the rest of France was fully subdued. The French residents of the zone, some 7 million people accounting for nearly 20% of the French population at the time, were to be deported, and the land then occupied by at least a million German settlers. The plan was either postponed or abandoned after Operation Barbarossa in favor of expediting the settlement of the east instead and was never put into place owing to the German defeat in the Second World War.

Mediterranean Aryans
Nazi propaganda described the Mediterranean race as brown-haired, brown-eyed, light skinned but slightly darker than their Northern European counterparts, and short (average ), with dolichocephalic or mesocephalic skulls, and lean builds. People who fit this category were described as "lively, even loquacious" and "excitable, even passionate", but they were also described as being "prone to act more on feeling than on reason", and as a result, "this race has produced only a few outstanding men.”

The question of the South Tyrol was largely and pragmatically dealt with by Hitler and Mussolini: this region of Austria's Tyrol, which was annexed by Italy after 1919, would not become a constituent district of Ostmark (present-day Austria). Ethnic Germans who lived in the South Tyrol were given the option of either migrating back to the German Reich or remaining in the South Tyrol where they would undergo forced Italianization.

Italians
Nazi racial theorists questioned the amount of Aryan blood Italians had. Hitler himself viewed northern Italians as strongly Aryan, but not southern Italians. The Nazis viewed the downfall of the Roman Empire as being caused by racial intermixing, claiming that Italians were a hybrid of races, including black African races. When Hitler met Italian fascist leader Benito Mussolini in June 1934 he told him that all Mediterranean peoples were "tainted" by Negro blood.

Greeks
During a speech in 1920, Hitler claimed that civilisation in Greece came from Aryans. In his unpublished Second Book in 1928 he wrote that Sparta must be regarded as the first Folkish state. Similarly, during a speech in August 1929 he reiterated the same thought by stating that Sparta was the "purest racial state" in history.

Alfred Rosenberg believed that the civilisation of Ancient Greece was the result of an "Aryan-Greek race soul". Himmler instructed the people carrying out Ahnenerbe think tank to study the "Indo-Germanic and Aryan" origins of Greece.

Eastern Aryans
During the mid-1930s foreign diplomats from Iran and Turkey who visited Germany wanted to know what the Nazis regarded them as, since Iranians in particular spoke an Indo-European language. The Nazis concluded that the Indo-European language speakers (including Proto-Indo-European languages, such as the Anatolian language), from Asia such as the Iranians and Turks were Aryans. The Nazis regarded the Turks to be Europeans.

Iranians

Beginning in 1933, the Nazi leadership in Germany made efforts to increase their influence in Iran, and they financed and managed a racist journal, Iran-e Bastan, co-edited by a pro-Nazi Iranian, Abdulrahman Saif Azad. This and other chauvinistic publications in the 1930s were popular among Iranian elites; they "highlighted the past and the pre-Islamic glories of the Persian nation and blamed the supposedly 'savage Arabs and Turks' for the backwardness of Iran.” In Iran:

Nazi ideology was most common among Persian officials, elites, and intellectuals, but "even some members of non-Persian groups were eager to identify themselves with the Nazis" and a supposed Aryan race. Hitler declared Iran to be an "Aryan state"; the changing of Persia's international name to Iran in 1935 was done by the Shah at the suggestion of the German ambassador to Iran as an act of "Aryan solidarity".

In 1936, the Nazi Office of Racial Politics, in response to a question from the German Foreign Ministry, classified non-Jewish Turks as Europeans, but "left unanswered the question of how to think about the obviously non-European Arabs, Persians, and Muslims." Later that year, ahead of the Summer Olympic Games in Berlin, the Nazis responded to questions from the Egyptians by saying that the Nuremberg racial laws did not apply to them, and after the Iranian ambassador to Berlin "assured German officials that 'there was no doubt that the Iranian, as an Aryan,' was 'racially kindred (artverwandt) with the Germans," the German Foreign Ministry "assured the Iranian Embassy in Berlin that the correct distinction between was not between "Aryans and non-Aryans" but rather between "persons of German and related blood on one hand and Jews as well as racially alien on the other."

Historian Jeffrey Herf writes:

Turks
After the passing of the Nuremberg Laws, the question of racially classifying Turks became a debated topic for the Nazi Party Office of Racial Policy. In January 1936, there were reports of Germans with Turkish ancestry experiencing difficulties by the state and the Nazi Party. The German Foreign Ministry stated that it was "essential that determination of whether the Turks are Aryan be decided as soon as possible" so he could tell the Turkish Embassy a "satisfactory answer". German diplomats were instructed answer to any enquiry about it that: "in Germany the Turkish people are seen as a European people and that therefore the individual Turkish citizen receives the same treatment by German race law as the members of other European states". That decision prompted the Turkish press to publish newspapers with the headline, "The Turks are Aryans!".

Georgians
Hitler remarked about the Georgians during one of his table talks:
 
Compared to other Soviet nationalities, Georgians were given preferential treatment and there was even a Georgian Legion. Hitler also theorized that Joseph Stalin's Georgian ethnicity, as well as the fact that the Georgian SSR was nominally autonomous, would eventually draw the Georgians closer to the USSR than to Germany. Several Georgian scholars such as Alexander Nikuradze and Michael Achmeteli served as advisors for Nazis such as Alfred Rosenberg.

On 24 August 1939 during the meeting of the Nazi-Soviet pact, Hitler asked his personal photographer Heinrich Hoffmann to photograph Georgian-born Soviet leader Joseph Stalin's earlobes to determine whether or not he was an "Aryan" or a "Jew". Hitler concluded that he was an “Aryan”. Himmler regarded Stalin as being descended from lost “Nordic-Germanic-Aryan blood”.

Slavs
Historian John Connelly argues that the Nazi policies carried out against the Slavs during World War II cannot be fully explained by the racist theories endorsed by the Nazis because of the contradictions and opportunism that occurred during the war. Prior to the outbreak of the war in 1939, there was only a vague notion of Slavs as an inferior group in the minds of the leading Nazis. How inferior would be determined later on during the war.

The Nazis thought that Eastern Europe, namely the areas whose inhabitants speak Slavic languages, was the most racially inferior part of Europe, and very distinct from the rest of Europe.

Günther in his book The Racial Science of Europe wrote that the Slavs were originally Nordic but over the centuries had mixed with other races. In The Racial Elements of European History he wrote: "The east of Europe shows a gradual transition of the racial mixtures of Central Europe into predominantly East Baltic and Inner Asiatic regions... Owing to the likeness between East Baltic and Inner Asiatic bodily characters it will often be hard to fix a sharp boundary between these two races”. He noted that the Nordic race was prominently found along the Vistula, the Neva, the Dwina and in southern Volhynia, but the further south and east, the East Baltic race became more common and finally in some regions there was “a strong Inner Asiatic admixture”. In the Russian-speaking regions he estimated were between at 25 per cent and 30 per cent Nordic. In the Polish regions there was an increase in the East Baltic race, Alpine race and Inner Asiatic the further east.

Günther, who greatly influenced Hitler and Nazi ideology, studied and wrote about the supposed racial origins of the Slavs. He concluded that Slavs were originally Nordic, but after mixing with other races over the centuries they eventually came to be predominantly of the East Baltic race. However, some Poles and other Slavs were considered to have enough Nordic admixture to be Germanised, because they were supposedly descended from the Nordic ruling class of the Early Slavs. He wrote that the further East the more the "Inner Asiatic" racial ancestry was prominent. He wrote that of the Poles and other Slavs who were predominantly of the East Baltic race that they were mentally slow, dirty and incapable of long term planning. He also claimed that the East Baltic race was the reason why some German districts had “a heavy proportion of crime."

Himmler in the 1920s was a member of the anti-Slavic Artaman League and wrote:

Hitler in Mein Kampf wrote that Germany’s Lebensraum (living space) was going to be in Eastern Europe:

Hitler in his unpublished second book Zweites Buch wrote that the Nazi Party’s foreign policy was going to be based on securing Lebensraum for the German people:

In the same book, he wrote that the peoples in the annexed territories would not be Germanised:

To justify their acquisition of Lebensraum (living space) for Germans, the Nazis later classified Slavs as a racially inferior “Asiatic-Bolshevik” horde.

During the war, the Gestapo persecuted sexual relations between Germans and the peoples of Eastern Europe because of the “risk for the racial integrity of the German nation”.

Himmler in a secret memorandum titled Reflections on the Treatment of Peoples of Alien Races in the East commented about the forceful Germanisation of children of German blood in Eastern Europe:

In the same memorandum, Himmler remarked that the future of the non-German population in the East would be:

In 1941, Himmler advocated that in the annexed territories a bulwark "be created against the Slav nations through the settlement of German farmers and farmers of German descent".  Himmler declared that the Germanisation of Eastern Europe would be fully completed when “in the East dwell only men with truly German, Germanic blood”.

Himmler in his Posen speeches in 1943 said:

Bulgarians
Joseph Goebbels wrote in his diary on 14 December 1938 that the Bulgarians were a “courageous people and also our friends”.

During the war, Hitler remarked “to label the Bulgarians as Slavs is pure nonsense; originally they were Turkomans”.

Croats
Hitler remarked about the Croats during a table talk:

The Croatian fascist Ustaše government rejected the idea that the Croats were descended from Slavic tribes and endorsed to the idea that they were descended from Germanic Gothic tribes. On 30 April 1941 the government passed three racial laws: the “Legal Decree on Racial Origins", the "Legal Decree on the Protection of Aryan Blood and the Honor of the Croatian People" and the "Legal Provision on Citizenship".

Bosniaks
The romantic notions that Himmler had about the Bosnian Muslims were probably significant in the genesis of the 13th Waffen Mountain Division of the SS Handschar (1st Croatian) and 23rd Waffen Mountain Division of the SS Kama (2nd Croatian). Nonetheless, a memorandum dated 1 November 1942 also indicates that leading Muslim autonomists had already suggested the creation of a volunteer Waffen-SS unit under German command. Himmler was personally fascinated by the Islamic faith and believed that Islam created fearless soldiers. He found their ferocity preferable to the gentility of Christians and believed their martial qualities should be further developed and put to use. He thought that Muslim men would make perfect SS soldiers as Islam "promises them Heaven if they fight and are killed in action."

Czechs
After the Nazis’ proclamation of the Protectorate of Bohemia and Moravia on 16 March 1939, Karl Frank defined a ‘German’ as:

The Nazis aimed to Germanise the Bohemian and Moravian areas. The issue of sexual relations and marriages between Czechs and Germans was problematic. The Nazis did not prohibit marriages between Czechs and Germans and no law prohibited Jews from marrying Czechs. German women who married Czech men lost their Reich citizenship whereas Czech women who married German men were allowed to become part of the German Volk.

Although Hitler considered Czechs to be of Mongolian origin, in accordance with the idea of completely Germanising the Protectorate of Bohemia and Moravia in 1940 he agreed with racial anthropologists that up to 50% of Czechs contained enough Nordic blood that they could be Germanised, while the "Mongoloid types" and the Czech intelligentsia were not to be Germanized and were to be “deprived of their power, eliminated, and shipped out of the country by all sorts of methods.”

In 1941 Hitler praised the "hard work and inventiveness of the Czechs" to his Propaganda Minister Goebbels and a year later he remarked that the Czechs were "industrious and intelligent workers".

Poles

Hitler thought of Poles as a foreign race and in Mein Kampf he criticised earlier attempts to Germanise ethnic Poles because he argued that the racial inferiority of the Poles would weaken the German nation.

Günther regarded Northern Poland as being predominantly Nordic and that the Nordic race was to be found amongst the upper classes.

An influential figure among German racist theorists was Otto Reche, who became director of the Institute for Racial and Ethnic Sciences in Lipsk and advocated the genocide of the Polish nation. In this position he wrote that ethnic Poles were "an unfortunate mixture" consisting among others of Slavs, Balts and Mongolians, and that they should be eliminated to avoid possible mixing with the German race. When Germany invaded Poland he wrote "We need Raum (space), but no Polish lice on our fur".

After the invasion of Poland, Nazi propaganda began to depict Poles as subhumans. On 24 October 1939, after a meeting in the Propaganda Ministry, the Directive No.1306 of Nazi Germany's Propaganda Ministry was issued and stated: "It must be made clear even to the German milkmaid that Polishness equals subhumanity. Poles, Jews and Gypsies are on the same inferior level... This should be brought home as a leitmotiv, and from time to time, in the form of existing concepts such as 'Polish economy', 'Polish ruin' and so on, until everyone in Germany sees every Pole, whether farm worker or intellectual, as vermin." Goebbels and Hitler believed that Asia began in Poland.

Goebbels in his diary on 10 October 1939 wrote what Hitler thought of the Poles:

In December 1939, Himmler declared that racial assessments were essential to avoid "mongrel types from emerging in the territories that are to be newly settled. I want to create a blond province."

The Polish decrees that were about forced Polish workers working in Germany and were enacted on 8 May 1940 stated that any Polish man or woman for having sexual intercourse with a German man or woman. Nazi propaganda issued leaflets for farmhouses where Polish workers resided and informed Germans:

German women who had sexual intercourse with Polish workers had their heads shaved and were then forced to have a placard around her neck detailing her crime and paraded around the place where she lived. After 1940, Poles were regularly hanged without trials for accusations of sexual intercourse with German women.

During the war Hitler stated that Germans should not mix with Poles in order to prevent any “Germanic blood” being transmitted to the Polish ruling class.

The Germanisation of Poles in Nazi-occupied Poland was troublesome since different Nazis had different beliefs about who could be Germanised. Although Gauleiter and Reichsstatthalter of Danzig-West Prussia Albert Forster advocated for the extermination of Poles, he was more than happy to accept Poles who claimed to have "German blood" to be Germans. Attempting to find out if those Poles were of German ancestry was almost an impossibility and Poles who were interviewed by Nazi Party workers were taken at face value without requiring any documents to prove their claims. However, this policy was at odds with Himmler and the Gauleiter and Reichsstatthalter of the German-occupied territory of Wartheland Arthur Greiser. Himmler and Greiser both advocated for an ethnic cleansing policy of the Poles in the Wartheland so the territory could be resettled by Germans. Hitler left each Gauleiter to Germanise his own territory to how he saw fit with "no questions asked". Under the classifications set out by the Deutsche Volksliste (German Peoples' List), approxaimtely two-thirds of the Polish population in Forster's occupation were classified as Germans.

Russians
Hitler in Mein Kampf wrote that, “The organization of a Russian state formation was not the result of the political abilities of the Slavs in Russia, but only a wonderful example of the state-forming efficacity of the German element in an inferior race”.

Influenced by the Guidelines for the Conduct of the Troops in Russia that were issued by the Oberkommando der Wehrmacht (OKW) on 19 May 1941, in a directive sent out to the troops under his command, General Erich Hoepner of the Panzer Group 4 stated:

After the invasion of the Soviet Union on 22 June 1941, the Nazis aimed to exterminate the peoples of the Soviet Union. An order by Hitler ordered that the Einsatzgruppen were to execute all Soviet functionaries who were "less valuable Asiatics, Gypsies and Jews". Nazi propaganda depicted the war against the Soviet Union as a racial war between Germans and the Jewish, Romani and Slavic sub-humans. Similarly, it depicted Russians as “Asiatic hordes”, “Mongol storm”, and “subhumans”.

Himmler gave a speech in Stettin to Waffen SS soldiers of the Eastern Front Battle Group "Nord" and said that the war was a battle of “ideologies and struggle races”. He argued that it was between Nazism that was based on “the values of our Germanic, Nordic blood” against “the 180 millionth people, a mixture of races and peoples, whose names are unpronounceable” which soldiers should “shoot without pity or mercy” and reminded the soldiers who were fighting in the war that they were fighting against “the same subhumans, against the same inferior races” that had appeared under different names 1,000 years ago, but reminded them that they were now called “Russian under the political banner of Bolshevism”.

Goebbels wrote an essay on 19 July 1942 titled “The So-Called Russian Soul” in which he argued that the Russians’ stubborn manner was down to their national character being “animalistic”.

Ukrainians
Initially after the invasion of the Soviet Union some Ukrainians viewed the German soldiers as “liberators” from the Soviets and some Nazis toyed with the idea of setting up an independent Ukraine state, but those views were short-lived after the German army began to murder Ukrainians en masse. Hitler and other leading Nazis forbade any Ukrainian independence. The Reichskommissar in Reichskommissariat Ukraine Erich Koch publicly declared the Ukrainians to be racially inferior and forbade subordinates from having any social contact with Ukrainians. Koch also publicly referred to the Ukrainians as “niggers”.

Hitler remarked during the war that the Ukrainians were “every bit as idle, disorganized, and nihilistically Asiatic as the Greater Russians”. He also speculated that blue-eyed Ukrainians were descended from ancient German tribes.

Koch on 5 March 1943 said:

In 1943, Himmler foresaw the publication of a pamphlet which showed photographs illustrating the alleged racial superiority of the Germans and the racial inferiority of the Ukrainians.

Jews

Hitler shifted the blame for Germany's loss in the First World War upon the "enemies from within". In the face of economic hardship as triggered by the Treaty of Versailles (1919), Jews who resided in Germany were blamed for sabotaging the country. The Nazis, therefore, classified them as the most inferior race and used derogatory terms such as Untermensch (sub-human) and Schwein (pig). Nazi propaganda endorsed the anti-Semitic Stab-in-the-back conspiracy theory which claimed that the Germans did not lose the First World War, but instead were betrayed by German citizens, especially Jews.

Hitler on 24 February 1920 announced the 25-point Program of the Nazi Party. Point 4 stated, "None but members of the nation may be citizens of the state. None but those of German blood, whatever their creed may be. No Jew, therefore, may be a member of the nation."

Günther described in his works, for instance in Rassenkunde des jüdischen Volkes ("Ethnology of the Jewish people"), that Jews belonged predominantly to the "Near Eastern race" (often known as the “Armenoid race"). He thought that Jews had become so racially mixed that they could possibly be regarded as a "race of the second-order". He described Ashkenazi Jews as being mixed of Near Eastern, Oriental, East Baltic, Inner-Asian, Nordic, Hamite and Negro, and Sephardi Jews as being mixed of Oriental, Near Eastern, Mediterranean, Hamite, Nordic, and Negro. He believed that Jews had physical characteristics different from Europeans. After concluding the racial origins of Jews, Günther began to develop theories about why Jews were so distinguishable as a people and different to European peoples; he wrote that it was because of the way they looked, spoke, gestured and smelled.

In 1934 the Nazis published a pamphlet titled "Why the Aryan Law?" which attempted to justify the segregation of non-Jewish Germans and Jewish Germans.

In 1935, the Nazis announced the Nuremberg Laws which forbid sexual relations and marriages between non-Jewish Germans and Jewish Germans. The laws also stated that Jews were not allowed to employ non-Jewish Germans who were under 45 years old in their households and Jews were not allowed to fly Reich or national flag or display Reich colours.

Romani people (Gypsies)

The Nazis believed that Gypsies were originally Aryans, but over the centuries due to their nomadic lifestyle they had mixed with non-Aryans and therefore regarded them as an “alien race”. Gypsies were subjected to the Nuremberg Laws and were forbidden from having sexual relations and marriages with people of "German or related blood" and were stripped of their citizenship.

The Nazis established the Racial Hygiene and Demographic Biology Research Unit in 1936. It was headed by Robert Ritter and his assistant Eva Justin, this Unit was mandated to conduct an in-depth study of the "Gypsy question (Zigeunerfrage)" and to provide data required for formulating a "Gypsy law".

After extensive fieldwork in the spring of 1936, consisting of interviews and medical examinations to determine the racial classification of the Roma, the Unit decided that most Romani, whom they had concluded were not of "pure Gypsy blood", posed a danger to German racial purity and should be deported or eliminated. No decision was made regarding the remainder (about 10 percent of the total Romani population of Europe), primarily Sinti and Lalleri tribes living in Germany. Several suggestions were made. Himmler suggested deporting the Romani to a remote reservation, as had been done by the United States for its Native Americans, where "pure Gypsies" could continue their nomadic lifestyle unhindered. According to him:

Although the law Himmler wanted never was enacted, in 1938 he advised that to solve the “Gypsy Question” it could be done “on the basis of race”.

Black people

In Mein Kampf, Hitler described the children who resulted from relationships between European women and French occupation soldiers of African origin as a contamination of the Aryan race "by Negro blood on the Rhine in the heart of Europe."  He blamed the Jews for these so-called Rhineland Bastards, writing that “[Jews] were responsible for bringing Negroes into the Rhineland, with the ultimate idea of bastardizing the white race which they hate and thus lowering its cultural and political level so that the Jew might dominate.” He also implied that this was a plot on the part of the French, saying the population of France was being increasingly "negrified".

The Nazis banned jazz music because they considered it “corrupt Negro music”. The Nazis believed that the existence of jazz in Germany was a Jewish plot to dominate Germany and the non-Jewish German people and destroy German culture.

Nazi eugenicist Eugen Fischer, who was also a professor of anthropology and eugenics, thought that Germany's small black population should be sterilised in order to protect the German people. In 1938, at least 400 black children were forcibly sterilised in the Rhineland.

Black people were subjected to discrimination under the Nuremberg Laws and as a result, they were not allowed to be Reich citizens and they were also forbidden from having sexual relations or marriages with people who were of “German or related blood” (Aryans).

Racialist ideology

Ideology 

Different Nazis offered a range of pseudo-religious or pseudoscientific arguments to prove that the Aryan race was superior to all other races. The central dogma of Aryan superiority was espoused throughout the party by officials who used scientific racist propaganda.

A person deemed to be a "subhuman" would be stripped of all of his/her rights, he or she would be treated like an animal, his or her life would be considered a Lebensunwertes Leben (life unworthy of living) and he or she would only be considered fit for enslavement and extermination.

In schools, Nazi ideology taught German youths to understand the differences which supposedly existed between the Nordic German "Übermenschen" and the "ignoble" Jewish and Slavic "subhumans". An illustration of this ideology was described in the 1990s by a German-Jewish woman, who vividly recalled hearing Nazis march by her home in central Germany in the mid-1930s while they were singing, "When Jewish blood squirts from my knife." A biography of Lise Meitner  says "In the Reichstag the NSDAP deputies stretched their arms in the Nazi salute and sang their party anthem, the Horst Wessellied: "SA marching... Jew blood in the streets".'

Richard Walther Darré, Reich Minister of Food and Agriculture from 1933 to 1942, popularized the expression "Blut und Boden" ("Blood and Soil"), one of the many terms in the Nazi glossary ideologically used to enforce popular racism in the German population. There were many academic and administrative scholars of race who all had somewhat divergent views of racism, including Alfred Rosenberg and Hans F. K. Günther.

Fischer and Lenz were appointed to senior positions overseeing the policy of racial hygiene. The Nazi state used such ideas about the differences between European races as part of their various discriminatory and coercive policies which culminated in the Holocaust.

The first (1916) edition of the American eugenicist Madison Grant's popular book The Passing of the Great Race classified Germans as being primarily Nordic, but the second edition, published after the US had entered WWI, reclassified the now-enemy power as being dominated by "inferior" Alpines, a tradition which was echoed in Harvard Professor of Anthropology Carleton Coon's book The Races of Europe (1939).

Günther's book stated that the Germans are definitely not a fully Nordic people, and it also divided them into Western (Mediterranean), Nordic, Eastern (Alpine), East Baltic and Dinaric races. Hitler himself was later to downplay the importance of Nordicism in public for this very reason. The simplistic tripartite model of Grant which divided Europeans into only Alpine, Mediterranean, and Nordic, Günther did not use, and erroneously placed most of the population of Hitler's Germany in the Alpine category, especially after the Anschluss. This has been used to downplay the Nordic presence in Germany. Gunther considered Jews an "Asiatic race inferior to all European races".

J. Kaup led a movement opposed to Günther. Kaup took the view that a German nation, all of whose citizens belonged to a "German race" in a populationist sense, offered a more convenient sociotechnical tool than Günther's concept of an ideal Nordic type to which only a very few Germans could belong. Nazi legislation identifying the ethnic and "racial" affinities of the Jews reflects the populationist concept of race. Discrimination was not restricted to Jews who belonged to the "Semitic-Oriental-Armenoid" and/or "Nubian-African/Negroid" races, but was directed against all members of the Jewish ethnic population.

The German Jewish journalist Kurt Caro, who emigrated to Paris in 1933 and served in the French and British armies, published a book under the pseudonym Manuel Humbert unmasking Hitler's Mein Kampf in which he stated the following racial composition of the Jewish population of Central Europe: 23.8% Lapponoid race, 21.5% Nordic race, 20.3% Armenoid race, 18.4% Mediterranean race, 16.0% Oriental race.

By 1939 Hitler had abandoned Nordicist rhetoric in favor of the idea that the German people as a whole were united by distinct "spiritual" qualities. Nevertheless, Nazi eugenics policies continued to favor Nordics over Alpines and other racial groups, particularly during the war when decisions were being made about the incorporation of conquered peoples into the Reich. The Lebensborn program sought to extend the Nordic race.

In 1942 Hitler stated in private:

Hitler and Himmler planned to use the SS as the basis for the racial "regeneration" of Europe following the final victory of Nazism. The SS was to be a racial elite chosen on the basis of "pure" Nordic qualities.

Addressing officers of the SS-Leibstandarte "Adolf Hitler" Himmler stated:

The ultimate aim for those 11 years during which I have been the Reichsfuehrer SS has been invariably the same: to create an order of good blood which is able to serve Germany; which unfailingly and without sparing itself can be made use of because the greatest losses can do no harm to the vitality of this order, the vitality of these men, because they will always be replaced; to create an order which will spread the idea of Nordic blood so far that we will attract all Nordic blood in the world, take away the blood from our adversaries, absorb it so that never again, looking at it from the viewpoint of grand policy, Nordic blood, in great quantities and to an extent worth mentioning, will fight against us.

Philosophy 
Philosophers and other theoreticians participated in the elaboration of Nazi ideology. The relationship between the German philosopher Martin Heidegger and Nazism has remained a controversial subject in the history of philosophy, even today. According to the philosopher Emmanuel Faye, Heidegger said of Spinoza that he was "ein Fremdkörper in der Philosophie", a "foreign body in philosophy"—Faye notes that Fremdkörper was a term which belonged to the Nazi glossary, and not to classical German. However, Heidegger did to a certain extent criticize racial science, particularly in his Friedrich Nietzsche lectures, which reject biologism in general, while generally speaking even Heidegger's most German nationalist and pro-Nazi works of the early 30s, such as his infamous Rectorial address, lack any overtly racialized language. Thus it is problematic to connect Heidegger with any racial theory. Carl Schmitt elaborated a philosophy of law praising the Führerprinzip and the German people, while Alfred Baeumler instrumentalized Nietzsche's thought, in particular his concept of the "Will to Power", in an attempt to justify Nazism.

Propaganda and implementation of racial theories 

The Nazis developed an elaborate system of propaganda which they used to diffuse their racial theories. Nazi architecture, for example, was used to create the "new order" and improve the "Aryan race". The Nazis also believed that they could use Sports to "regenerate the race" by exposing supposedly inferior peoples, namely the Jews, as slovenly, sedentary and out-of-shape. One of the basic motivations of the Hitler Youth, founded in 1922, was the training of future "Aryan supermen" and future soldiers who would faithfully fight for the Third Reich.

In 1920 the Nazi Party announced that only Germans of “pure Aryan descent” could become party members and if the person had a partner then he or she also had to be a "racially pure" Aryan. Party members could not be related either directly or indirectly to a so-called "non-Aryan". Nazi Party members and members of other Nazi organisations had to ask permission  from their regional party official (Gauleiter) if they wanted to marry people who had two grandparents who were members of the “Czech, Polish, or Magyar Volk groups”. German farmers who were Nazi Party members were prohibited from marrying Czechs and Poles in order to “preserve the purity” of their “own racial and ethnic foundations” to prevent the latter from marrying into German farmsteads.

German cinema was used to promote racist theories, under the direction of Goebbels' Propagandaministerium. The German Hygiene Museum in Dresden diffused racial theories. A 1934 poster of the museum shows a man with distinctly African features and reads, "If this man had been sterilized there would not have been born ... 12 hereditarily diseased."(sic). According to the current director Klaus Voegel, "The Hygiene Museum was not a criminal institute in the sense that people were killed here," but "it helped to shape the idea of which lives were worthy and which were worthless."

Nazi racial theories were soon translated into legislation, the most notable pieces of legislation were the July 1933 Law for the Prevention of Hereditarily Diseased Offspring and the 1935 Nuremberg Laws. The Aktion T4 euthanasia program, in which the Kraft durch Freude (KdF, literally "Strength Through Joy") youth organization participated, targeted people accused of representing a danger of "degeneration" towards the "Deutsche Volk". Under the race laws, sexual relations between Aryans (cf. Aryan certificate) and non-Aryans known as Rassenschande ("race defilement") became punishable by law.

To preserve the "racial purity" of the German blood, after the beginning of the war the Nazis extended the race defilement law to include all foreigners (non-Germans).

Despite the laws against Rassenschande, German soldiers raped Jewish women during the Holocaust.

The Nazi regime called for all German people who wanted to be citizens of the Reich to produce proof of Aryan ancestry. Certain exceptions were made when Hitler issued the "German Blood Certificate" for those people who were classified to be of partial Aryan and Jewish ancestry by the race laws.

During World War II, Germanization efforts were carried out in Central and Eastern Europe in order to cull those people of "German blood" who lived there. This started with the classification of people into the Volksliste. Those people who were considered German and selected for inclusion in the Volksliste were either kidnapped and sent to Germany to undergo Germanization, or they were killed in order to prevent "German blood" from being used against the Nazis. In regions of Poland, many Poles were either murdered or deported in order to make room for Baltic Germans induced to emigrate after the pact with the USSR. Efforts were made to identify people of German descent with Nordic traits from pre-war citizens of Poland. If these individuals passed the screening process test and were considered "racially valuable", they were abducted from their parents to be Germanized and then sent to Germany to be raised as Germans. Those children who failed such tests might be used as subjects in medical experiments or as slave laborers in German industry.

Western countries, such as France, were treated less harshly because they were viewed as racially superior to the "subhuman" Poles who were to be enslaved and exterminated, though they were not considered as good as full Germans were; a complex of racial categories was boiled down by the average German to mean that "East is bad and West is acceptable." Still, extensive racial classification was practiced in France, for future uses.

Notes

References

Bibliography

 

 

1930s introductions
Anti-Armenianism in Europe
Antisemitism in Germany
Anti-Slavic sentiment
Antiziganism in Europe
Racism in Germany
Society of Nazi Germany